Mount Idaho, at  above sea level is the seventh highest peak in Idaho and the sixth highest in the Lost River Range. The peak is located in Salmon-Challis National Forest in Custer Countyin the US State of the same name. Merriam Lake is in the basin to the northeast of the peak.

References 

Idaho
Idaho
Salmon-Challis National Forest